Stadionul Ceahlăul is a multi-purpose stadium in Piatra Neamț, Romania. It is currently used mostly for football matches and is the home ground of Ceahlăul Piatra Neamţ. The stadium, as well as the local football club takes its name from the Ceahlău Massif, located in the region. The stadium holds 18,000 people, and after major rehabilitation works, received a Category 3 ranking. The 2008 Cupa României Final and the 2011 Supercupa României were held on this stadium. It is the 10th stadium in the country by capacity.

Events

Association football

Gallery

References

External links 
 360 Virtual Tour

Football venues in Romania
Piatra Neamț
Multi-purpose stadiums in Romania
Buildings and structures in Neamț County